The 2022 Big Ten men's soccer tournament was the 32nd edition of the tournament. As the tournament champion, Rutgers earned the Big Ten Conference's automatic berth into the 2022 NCAA Division I men's soccer tournament.

Seeding 

Seeding was determined by regular season conference record points per game.

Bracket

References

External links 
 Big Ten Conference Men's Soccer
 Big Ten Men's Soccer Tournament Central

Big Ten Men's Soccer Tournament